Pingdong may refer to:

Pingtung County (屏東縣), or Pingdong from its pinyin name, Taiwan, Republic of China
Pingtung City (屏東市), the seat of Pingtung County

See also
 Pingtung (disambiguation)